See You Later is an album by the Greek electronic composer Vangelis, released in November 1980. It breaks quite violently with the style he had employed in the late 1970s and later, relying much more on vocals and being more experimental and returning (in many respects) to his early 1970s work like Earth or 666. It was never released in the United States, until it was remastered in 2016 as part of the Delectus boxset.

Overview
See You Later is Vangelis' most wide-ranging work of the 1980s, with more radical musical and lyrical themes than are found in his other albums. The concept album is bleaker than most of his records, incorporating negative and satirical intonations of a dystopian future. Subjects touched on include funerals, masks, and ready-to-wear and ready-to-eat things.

The lyrics are written by Vangelis in English, French and Italian; they use electronic terminology and incorporate references to lost love, and the downfall of humanity due to the influence of technology. The title track lyrics say "See you later then... alive or dead". Track "Suffocation" was inspired by the Seveso disaster in Italy.

The album's sleeve shows an ice-covered ocean with a woman wearing sunglasses to protect her eyes; the image uses optical compression in the horizontal axis. The inner sleeve is also disturbing, displaying a character seated in a greenhouse wearing an eerie-looking gas mask.

Instruments and style
Vangelis plays all instruments: synthesizers, electric piano, grand piano and drums. The Korg KR-55 drum machine is used extensively. Michel Ripoche plays the violin on #4. Vocals featured are by Jon Anderson (tracks #5 and #6), Peter Marsh (track #1), Christina and Maurizio Arcieri from the group Krisma (track #5) and Cherry Vanilla (track #4 narrative).

Composition
"I Can't Take It Anymore" is sung by Peter Marsh through a vocoder over a deep synthesizer glissando bass, a synthesizer choir and KR-55 hihats. "Multitrack Suggestion" is Kraftwerk-style and Eurodisco, which builds on a polysynth and upbeat KR-55 pulse; the choir sings some terms associated with analog synthesizer technology (VCO, VCF). "Memories of Green" is a slow piano-based piece with a backdrop of synthesizer sounds and bleeps from the 1978 Bambino electronic game "UFO Master Blaster Station". The piano used on this piece was a Steinway Grand piano. Its distinctive "drunk" sound was achieved with the use of an Electroharmonix Electric Mistress flanger pedal.  This song was used in Vangelis' subsequent soundtrack to the 1982 film Blade Runner.

"Not A Bit – All Of It" has vocals by Cherry Vanilla. "Suffocation" employs the KR-55 and a saw wave synthesizer melody, followed by an eerie brass and megaphone emergency announcements in Italian. The second (slower) half of the piece features vocals by Jon Anderson and a narrative in Italian, by Krisma (Maurizio Arcieri and Christina Moser). "See You Later" has Vangelis on electric piano and staccato male atonal choir. About halfway through, there is a child narrative in French, with Anderson's vocals used in the finale.

Track listing
All songs composed and written by Vangelis.

A test 8-track test pressing (never officially released) has also surfaced without the title track, but includes the track "My Love" which was featured on a previous single "My Love/Domestic Logic 1", along with two additional tracks "Neighbours Above" and "Fertilization".

Side One:
 "My Love" – 4:02
 "Not A Bit – All Of It" – 2:55
 "Neighbours Above" – 4:48
 "I Can't Take It Anymore" – 5:38
 "Memories of Green" – 5:42

Side Two:
 "Fertilization" – 7:28
 "Suffocation" – 9:22
 "Multi-Track Suggestion" – 5:25

The track "Memories of Green" was later used by Vangelis in his soundtrack for the 1982 film Blade Runner.

Personnel 
 Vangelis - synthesizers and all instruments, Vocalese [Uncredited] on "Not a Bit – All of It"
 Jon Anderson - vocals on "Suffocation" and "See You Later" 
 Raphael Preston - noises [Bambino Ufo Master Blaster Station, Uncredited]
 Krisma (Maurizio Arcieri and Christina Moser) - Italian voice (Uncredited) on "Suffocation"
 Peter Marsh - vocals [Uncredited] on "I Can't Take It Any More" and "Multi-Track Suggestion"
 Cherry Vanilla, Andrew Hoy - vocals on "Not a Bit – All of It"
 Michel Ripoche - violin on "Not a Bit – All of It"

Production 
 Vangelis : Producer, arranger, photography, design
 Raphael Preston, John Walker : Engineers
 Raine Shine : Studio assistant
 Veronique Skawinska, Alwyn Clayden : Design, photography

References

 Personnel + Production : https://www.discogs.com/fr/Vangelis-See-You-Later/release/4392264

External links
 See You Later at Vangelis Lyrics
 See You Later at Vangelis Collector Site

1980 albums
Vangelis albums
Polydor Records albums